Arpine Martoyan (born 10 January 2007), known professionally as Maléna, is an Armenian singer and songwriter. She represented Armenia in the Junior Eurovision Song Contest 2021 with the song "", and went on to win the competition, becoming the second Armenian entrant to win the Junior Eurovision Song Contest.

Early life
Born in Yerevan on 10 January 2007, Maléna was raised by her mother Anna Manucharyan, an actress. Together with her mother, she has appeared in several episodes of television comedy series Stone Cage. Maléna studies at the Sayat-Nova music school, where she learned to play the cello.

Career

Junior Eurovision Song Contest

Maléna first attempted to represent Armenia in the Junior Eurovision Song Contest 2018, taking part in the national selection Depi Mankakan Evratesil with the song "Par" under the name Arpi, placing 8th in the semi-final.

Since 2020, Maléna has been collaborating with TKN Entertainment, a Yerevan-based record label owned by Tokionine. She was set to represent Armenia in the Junior Eurovision Song Contest 2020 with the song "Why", but the country withdrew from the contest due to the 2020 Nagorno-Karabakh war.

She was again selected the following year to represent Armenia in the Junior Eurovision Song Contest 2021 in Paris, France with the song "Qami Qami" ("Wind, Wind" in Armenian). The song, described as "space-pop", was composed by Tokionine and was written by Vahram Petrosyan, Tokionine, David Tserunyan and Maléna herself. While talking about co-writing the song and the message of it, Maléna said: "I’d never think that I’d be writing lyrics that one day would be shared with such a big audience. It’s such a huge honor. The song is about finding yourself and finding a way to keep going. Don’t you ever think of falling down again…always be true to who you are". As a result of her win, Armenia earned the right to host the Junior Eurovision Song Contest 2022. In May 2022, Maléna made an appearance during the first semi-final of Eurovision Song Contest in Turin, Italy, announcing Yerevan as the host city for the Junior Eurovision Song Contest 2022.

Following her win, she received the Armenian Scholarship for a summer program at the Berklee College of Music, in Boston, Massachusetts. In addition, she performed her winning song at the Armenian Heritage Park in Boston, on 31 July 2022.

On October 23, 2022, she released a cover of the song "Cheri Cheri Lady" by German band Modern Talking. In February 2023, the song went viral on TikTok in Indonesia and Vietnam then reaching the top of the iTunes and Top 50 Viral on Spotify in Vietnam. On February 26, the song reached the general Top 50 songs in Vietnam on Spotify. The song debuted at number 72 on the Billboard Vietnam Hot 100 list published on March 2, 2023.

Artistry

Influences 
Maléna is inspired by pop and R&B music. She pointed out Jaden Smith and Rosalía as her favourites, for their musical creations and visual style.

Discography

Singles

References

External links 
 Maléna on Junioreurovision.tv

Armenian child singers
Junior Eurovision Song Contest entrants for Armenia
Living people
21st-century Armenian women singers
2007 births
Junior Eurovision Song Contest winners